Carlos Julio Moreno is a Colombian mathematician and faculty member at Baruch College and at the Graduate Center of the City University of New York (CUNY).

His B.A. and his Ph.D. in mathematics were earned at New York University. Moreno has over sixty publications, including two books, on topics dealing with algebra and number theory.

Selected publications

References

External links
Baruch College, Department of Mathematics, Masters Program in Financial Engineering 

City University of New York faculty
Year of birth missing (living people)
Living people
20th-century American mathematicians
21st-century American mathematicians
New York University alumni